"Lascolabacillus massiliensis"  is a bacterium from the genus "Lascolabacillus" which has been isolated from the human gut flora.

References 

Bacteroidia
Bacteria described in 2016